Kord-e Sofla (also Romanized as Kord-e Soflá; also known as Kard-e Pā’īn, Kord-e Pā’īn, and Kurd) is a village in Karvan-e Olya Rural District, Karvan District, Tiran and Karvan County, Isfahan Province, Iran. At the 2006 census, its population was 784, in 199 families.

References 

Populated places in Tiran and Karvan County